The 1942 All-Big Ten Conference football team consists of American football players selected to the All-Big Ten Conference teams selected by the Associated Press (AP) and United Press (UP) for the 1942 Big Ten Conference football season. Dave Schreiner was the only unanimous pick with 18 points (representing all nine first-team picks); Julius Franks and Dick Wildung followed with 17 points each.

All Big-Ten selections

Ends
Dave Schreiner, Wisconsin (AP-1, UP-1)
Bob Shaw, Ohio State (AP-1, UP-1)
Pete Pihos, Indiana (UP-2)
Bill Parker, Iowa (UP-2)

Tackles
Dick Wildung, Minnesota (AP-1, UP-1)
Al Wistert, Michigan (AP-1, UP-1)
Charles Csuri, Ohio State (UP-2)
Paul Hirsbrunner, Wisconsin (UP-2)

Guards
Julius Franks, Michigan (AP-1, UP-1)
Lin Houston, Ohio State (AP-1, UP-1)
Alex Agase, Illinois (UP-2)
John Billman, Minnesota (UP-2)

Centers
Fred Negus, Wisconsin (AP-1, UP-1)
Merv Pregulman, Michigan (AP-2, UP-2)

Quarterbacks
George Ceithaml, Michigan (AP-1, UP-1)
Otto Graham, Northwestern (AP-2, UP-2)

Halfbacks
Billy Hillenbrand, Indiana (AP-1, UP-1)
Elroy Hirsch, Wisconsin (AP-1, UP-2)
Paul Sarringhaus, Ohio State (AP-2, UP-1)
Tom Farmer, Iowa (UP-2)
Tom Kuzma, Michigan (AP-2)

Fullbacks
Pat Harder, Wisconsin (AP-1, UP-1)
Gene Fekete, Ohio State (UP-2)

Key

AP = Associated Press, chosen by conference coaches

UP = United Press

References

1942 Big Ten Conference football season
All-Big Ten Conference football teams